The Department of California was an administrative department of the United States Army.  The Department was created in 1858, replacing the original Department of the Pacific, and it was ended by the reorganizations of the Henry L. Stimson Plan implemented in February 1913.  As with the preceding organization, headquarters were in San Francisco.  Its creation was authorized by General Orders, No. 10, of the War Department, Adjutant-General's Office, September 13, 1858.  

As first established, the department covered all territory within the latter-day state borders of Arizona, Nevada, California, and a sizable square of southwestern Oregon representing the Rogue River District and Umpqua District.

Commanders 
The Department of California was commanded first by Brevet Brigadier General Newman S. Clarke, Colonel U.S. 6th Infantry Regiment, until his death on October 17, 1860.  It was next commanded by Lt. Colonel Benjamin L. Beall, U.S. 1st Dragoon Regiment, who had assumed command, by seniority of rank, on the death of General Clarke, on October 17, 1860.  It was merged into the restored Department of the Pacific on January 15, 1861, as the District of California administering the same territories, commanded by Brevet Brigadier General Albert Sidney Johnston from January 15, 1861.

Reduction to District status 1861-1865
When General Edwin Vose Sumner, relieved General Johnston during March 1861 he continued in command of the Department of California now renamed the District of California.  His successor in October 1861, Brigadier General George Wright continued in command of the District even after losing command of the Department of the Pacific, on July 1, 1864, to Gen. Irvin McDowell.

Department again June 1865 - February 1913 
During June 1865, Col. Edward McGarry was ordered to succeed Brigadier General George Wright (who was relocating to his new command of the Department of the Columbia), in command of the District of California until General McDowell could take command of the District which was again raised to Department status once more under the Military Division of the Pacific, now commanded by Major General Henry W. Halleck.  The territory encompassed by the new Department of California now consisted of the States of California and Nevada and the District of New Mexico and District of Arizona in the Territories of New Mexico and Arizona. Maj. Gen. Irvin McDowell, U. S. Army, assigned to command the Department of California.

The Department of Arizona was established as part of the Division of the Pacific on April 15, 1870. It consisted of Arizona Territory and California south of a line from the northwest corner of Arizona to Point Conception so as to include most of Southern California.

From December 7, 1871, the one general officer at San Francisco commanded both the Division of the Pacific and the Department of California and the separate staffs were consolidated into one. On July 1, 1878, Division of the Pacific headquarters was relocated from San Francisco to the Presidio of San Francisco.

The Department of Arizona lost Southern California to the Department of California on February 14, 1883, but regained California south of the 35th parallel on December 15, 1886. The Department of California then consisted of California north of the 35th parallel and Nevada.

The Military Division of the Pacific was discontinued on July 3, 1891. Each of the three subordinate departments of Arizona, California, and the Columbia, then reported directly to the War Department. The Department of California, with its headquarters at San Francisco, consisted of California north of the 35th parallel and Nevada.

The Hawaiian Islands were added to the department July 12, 1898.  It became the District of Hawaii in 1910 as part of the Department of California.

From 1904 to 1907, the Department of California, as well as the Department of the Columbia, were subordinate to a re-established Division of the Pacific known as Pacific Division. It became independent again after 1907 until they were subordinated to a new Western Division from 1911 to 1913.    

On February 15, 1913 the Department of California, with all the mainland territorial departments, was disbanded for a new organization of the Army. The territory of the former departments of the Columbia and California were now controlled by the Western Department, except for the District of Hawaii that now became the independent Department of Hawaii.

Commanders

Department of California 1865 to December 7, 1871 
 General Irvin McDowell, July 27, 1865 - March 31, 1868
 Major General Henry Halleck, (temp), March 31, 1868 - April 24, 1868
 Major General E. O. C. Ord, April 24, 1868 - November 18, 1871

Military Division of the Pacific and Department of California 
 Major General John M. Schofield, December 7, 1871 - July 1, 1876
 Major General Irvin McDowell,  July 1, 1876 - October 15, 1882
 Major General John M. Schofield, October 15, 1882 - November 30, 1883
 Major General John Pope, November 30, 1883 - March 16, 1886
 Major General Oliver Otis Howard, March 16, 1886 – 1888
 Brigadier General Nelson A. Miles, November 23, 1888 - September 1, 1890
 Brigadier General John Gibbon September 1, 1890 - April 20, 1891
 Brigadier General Thomas H. Ruger, April 20, 1891 - July, 1891

Department of California after July 3, 1891 - February 15, 1913
 Brigadier General Thomas H. Ruger,  July 3, 1891 - November 10, 1894
 Brigadier General James W. Forsyth,  November 10, 1894 - 1897
 Major General William Rufus Shafter 1897 - May 1898
 ?,  May 1898 - September 1898
 Major General William Rufus Shafter September 1898 - February 1901 
 Major General Samuel B. M. Young February 1901 - March 1902
 Major General Robert P. Hughes March 1902 - April 1, 1903
 Major General Arthur MacArthur, Jr., April 1, 1903 - September 30, 1904
 Brigadier General Francis Moore,  September 30, 1904 - March 31, 1905
 Brigadier-General Frederick Funston  March 31, 1905 - 1907
 Col. Marion F. Maus, Aug. 10, 1908 -
 Brigadier General John Joseph Pershing, 1907 - October 1908
 Brigadier General Frederick A. Smith, October 1908 - January 13, 1909
 Major General John F. Weston, January 13, 1909 - June 30, 1909 
 Major General Thomas H. Barry, June 30, 1909 - August 12, 1910
 Brigadier General Tasker H. Bliss August 12, 1910 - August 13, 1911
 Brig. Gen. Daniel H. Brush, from July 1, 1911, to April 7, 1912
 Colonel John P. Wisser, Coast Artillery Corps (temporary),  May 2 to June 26, 1912
 Brig. Gen. Walter S. Schuyler, June 27, 1912 - January 2, 1913
 Colonel John P. Wisser, January 3, 1913 - February 15, 1913

Posts in the Department of California

California
 Benicia Arsenal, Benicia, 1851–1964
 New San Diego Depot, San Diego, 1851-June, 1866.
 Fort Yuma, Fort Yuma Indian Reservation, 1851–1883
 Benicia Barracks, Benicia, 1852–1866
 Post of Alcatraz Island or Fort Alcatraz, 1853–1907
 Roop's Fort, Fort Defiance, Susanville 1853-1863 
 Fort Humboldt, Eureka, 1853–1867
 Fort Point San José, San Francisco, 1853–1882
 Fort Point, San Francisco, 1853–1886
 Fort Tejon, near Lebec, 1854-1861, 1863-1864.
 Camp Burton, near San Diego, 1855 
 Fort Crook 1857-1869 
Fort Bragg, 1857-1864.
Fort Ter-Waw, 1857-1862 
 Fort Mojave 1858-1861, 1863–1890
 Fort Beale 1859-1861 
 Fort Piute 1864-1868
Fort Gaston, 1859–1892
 Fort Soda, Hancock's Redoubt 1860  
 Fort Soda Lake or Camp Soda Springs (present-day Zzyzx) 1863 - 1868
 Camp Cady 1860-1871 20 miles east of Barstow
 Camp Allen, Oakland 1860-? 
 Camp Dragoon Bridge, 1860-1863

References

California
Military history of California
Military history of Arizona
Military history of Nevada
Military history of New Mexico
Military history of Utah
Military history of Oregon
California
1858 establishments in California
1858 establishments in the United States